Strange Worlds is a collection of science fiction by Ralph Milne Farley. Consisting of  one novel and two shorter novellas, it was first published in 1953 by Fantasy Publishing Company, Inc. in an edition of 300 copies.  The book is an omnibus of Farley's earlier books, The Radio Man and The Hidden Universe.  The novel was originally serialized in the magazine Argosy and the novellas originally appeared in the magazine Amazing Stories.

Contents
 The Radio Man
 "The Hidden Universe"
 "We, the Mist"

References

1953 short story collections
Science fiction short story collections
Fantasy Publishing Company, Inc. books